John Montague (August 25, 1903 – May 25, 1972) was an American golfer, who also played some minor-league baseball. Under the name LaVerne Moore, which was his original birth name, he was charged with armed robbery and assault over a 1930 case in upper New York State. He was acquitted in a 1937 trial.

Montague's life was covered in mystery and numerous stories about his extraordinary golf skills and physical strength. At the time of his arrest he lived with Esther Plunkett, and friends believed they were married. After leaving the jail, he could not regain his previous golf shape, due to gained weight and lack of practice. Hence he focused on his real estate business and private golf matches with celebrities. His 1937 charity game against Babe Ruth, Babe Didrikson, and Sylvania Annenberg drew approximately 10,000 spectators. Montague qualified for the 1940 U.S. Open, but performed poorly there. He died of heart problems, in obscurity, at a residence motel in Studio City, California.

References

American male golfers
Golfers from New York (state)
Sportspeople from Syracuse, New York
1903 births
1972 deaths